The 1999 WNBA Playoffs was the postseason for the Women's National Basketball Association's 1999 season which ended with the  Western Conference champion Houston Comets beating the Eastern Conference champion New York Liberty, 2-1. Cynthia Cooper was named the MVP of the Finals. The Comets completed a three-peat.

Road to the playoffs
Eastern Conference

Western Conference

Note:Teams with an "X" clinched playoff spots.

Playoffs

First round

Charlotte Sting vs. Detroit Shock

Sacramento Monarchs vs. Los Angeles Sparks

Conference Finals

Houston Comets vs. Los Angeles Sparks

New York Liberty vs. Charlotte Sting

WNBA Championship

Aftermath
The two teams would meet each other again in the 2000 WNBA Finals.

See also
List of WNBA Champions

References

Playoffs
Women's National Basketball Association Playoffs